Mirror Mirror may refer to:

Film 
 Mirror, Mirror (1979 film), an American made-for-television drama film
 Mirror, Mirror (1990 film), a 1990 horror film
 Mirror Mirror (film), a 2012 live-action adaptation of Snow White

Literature 
 "Mirror, mirror on the wall...", a variation of a famous phrase uttered by the wicked queen in certain adaptations of the 1812 fairy tale Snow White.
 Mirror, Mirror, a 1967 science-fiction short story by Alan E. Nourse.
 Mirror, Mirror (Bell novel), a 1996 novel by Hillary Bell based on the 1995 TV show of the same name
 Mirror, Mirror (novel), a 2003 novel by Gregory Maguire based on Snow White and the Seven Dwarfs
 Mirror Mirror: A History of the Human Love Affair With Reflection, a 2003 nonfiction book
Mirror Mirror, the planned upcoming 19th novel in The Dresden Files.

Music

Albums
 Mirror Mirror (10cc album) (1995), the 11th and last album by British pop band 10cc
 Mirror Mirror (Dardanelles album) (2007), their debut album
 Mirror Mirror (EP), by Twiztid
 Mirror Mirror (Ghinzu album), the third album by the Belgian rock band
 Mirror Mirror (Kelly Price album), the second album by the R&B singer-songwriter
 Mirror Mirror (Joe Henderson album), 1980
 Mirror, Mirror (Soundtrack) (1990), soundtrack for the film Mirror, Mirror
 Mirror, Mirror (EP), a 2013 EP by Farewell, My Love
 Mirror Mirror (Eliane Elias album) (2021)

Songs
 "Mirror Mirror" (4minute song), 2011
 "Mirror Mirror" (Blind Guardian song), 1998
 "Mirror, Mirror" (Diamond Rio song), 1991
 "Mirror Mirror" (Diana Ross song), 1981
 "Mirror Mirror" (Dollar song), also known as "Mirror Mirror (Mon Amour)"
 "Mirror Mirror" (Helloween song), 2000
 "Mirror Mirror" (M2M song), 2000, later covered by Taylor Horn
 "Mirror Mirror" (Solid Base song), 1995
 "Mirror, Mirror (Look into My Eyes)", by Def Leppard from High 'n' Dry
 "Mirror Mirror", by Candlemass from Ancient Dreams
 "Mirror, Mirror", by David Gates from The David Gates Songbook
 "Mirror Mirror", by Kamelot from Karma
 "Mirror Mirror", by King Diamond from Give Me Your Soul...Please
 "Mirror Mirror", by LL Cool J from 10
 "Mirror Mirror", by Pinkerton's Assorted Colours
 "Mirror Mirror (I See a Damsel)", a song by Violent Femmes from New Times
 “Mirror Mirror”, by Don Dokken from Up from the Ashes

Television 
"Mirror, Mirror", an episode the 1983 television animated series Dragon's Lair
 Mirror, Mirror (TV series), a 1995 Australia/New Zealand co-produced television series 
 Mirror, Mirror II, a co-production between Australia and New Zealand that was released in 1997
 Mirror, Mirror (TV series), a 2021 Australian factual television series hosted by Todd Sampson
 Mirror, Mirror, a TV program featuring Donna Douglas
 Mirror Mirror, a Greek television comedy starring Thanasis Veggos
 "Mirror, Mirror" (Amazing Stories), 1986
 "Mirror Mirror" (Desperate Housewives), 2008
 "Mirror Mirror" (House), 2007
 "Mirror, Mirror" (Star Trek: The Original Series), 1967
 "Mirror, Mirror on the Wall: Part 1", a Murder, She Wrote episode, followed by "Mirror, Mirror on the Wall: Part 2" (1989)

See also 
 
 
 Mirror (disambiguation)